Hanna Johansen, born Hanna Margarete Meyer (17 June 1939 in Bremen), is a Swiss writer.

She studied classical philology, education and German studies at the Universities of Marburg and Göttingen. From 1967 to 1969 she lived in Ithaca, New York, and in 1972 she moved with her then husband Adolf Muschg to Kilchberg, Zurich, where she still lives today.

Johansen began her literary career as a translator of American avant garde authors, and soon moved on to original work, particularly stories for children. She published her first novel in 1978. She is a member of PEN Switzerland and of the Deutschen Akademie für Sprache und Dichtung in Darmstadt.

Prizes 

 1980 Ehrengabe des Kantons Zürich
 1986 Marie-Luise-Kaschnitz-Preis
 1987 Conrad-Ferdinand-Meyer-Preis (together with Martin Hamburger)
 1990 Schweizerischer Jugendbuchpreis
 1991 Kinderbuchpreis des Landes Nordrhein-Westfalen
 1993 Österreichischer Kinder- und Jugendbuchpreis
 1993 Literaturpreis des Landes Kärnten beim Ingeborg-Bachmann-Wettbewerb
 1993 Phantastik-Preis der Stadt Wetzlar for Über den Himmel
 2003 Solothurner Literaturpreis
 2007 Anerkennungsgabe der Stadt Zürich

Works 
 Die stehende Uhr, 1978
 Jan und die Großmutter, 1978 (as Hanna Muschg, with Gisela Degler-Rummel)
 Ein Meister des Innehaltens, 1979
 Trocadero, 1980
 Die Analphabetin, 1982
 Auf dem Lande, Hörspiel, NDR, 1982
 Bruder Bär und Schwester Bär, 1983 (as Hanna Muschg)
 Die Ente und die Eule, 1984 (as Hanna Muschg)
 Siebenschläfergeschichten, 1985 (as Hanna Muschg)
 Über den Wunsch, sich wohlzufühlen, 1985
 Zurück nach Oraibi, 1986
 Felis Felis, 1987
 Ein Mann vor der Tür, 1988
 Die Geschichte von der kleinen Gans, die nicht schnell genug war, 1989
 Die Schöne am unteren Bildrand, 1990
 Dinosaurier gibt es nicht, 1992
 Über den Himmel, 1993
 Kurnovelle, 1994
 Ein Maulwurf kommt immer allein, 1994
 Der Füsch, 1995 (with Rotraut Susanne Berner)
 Die Hexe zieht den Schlafsack enger, 1995 (with Käthi Bhend)
 Universalgeschichte der Monogamie, 1997
 Der Zigarettenanzünder, Hörspiel, SWF, 1997
 Bist du schon wach?, 1998 (with Rotraut Susanne Berner)
 Halbe Tage, ganze Jahre, 1998
 Vom Hühnchen, das goldene Eier legen wollte, 1998 (with Käthi Bhend)
 Maus, die Maus, liest ein langes Buch, 2000 (with Klaus Zumbühl)
 Maus, die Maus, liest und liest, 2000 (with Klaus Zumbühl)
 Sei doch mal still!, 2001
 Lena, 2002
 "Omps!" – ein Dinosaurier zu viel, 2003
 Die Hühneroper, Zürich, Nagel & Kimche, 2004
 Ich bin hier bloß die Katze, 2007
 Der schwarze Schirm, 2007
 Ein Krokodil

Bibliography 
 Elisabeth Stuck: Hanna Johansen. Eine Studie zum erzählerischen Werk 1978–1995. Sprache und Dichtung. N.F. 44. Haupt, Bern 1997. 
 Vesna Kondric Horvat: Der eigenen Utopie nachspüren. Zur Prosa der deutschsprachigen Autorinnen in der Schweiz zwischen 1970 und 1990, dargestellt am Werk Gertrud Leuteneggers und Hanna Johansens. Lang, Bern 2002.

External links 
 
 
 Entry in Autorinnen und Autoren der Schweiz
 Der Solothurner Literaturpreis für Hanna Johansen 

1939 births
Swiss writers
Living people
Swiss women writers